63 athletes (46 men and 17 women) from Ireland competed at the 1996 Summer Paralympics in Atlanta, United States.

Medallists

See also
Ireland at the Paralympics
Ireland at the 1996 Summer Olympics

References 

Nations at the 1996 Summer Paralympics
1996
Summer Paralympics